Lakeside is an unincorporated community in southern Sheridan County, Nebraska, United States.  It lies along Nebraska Highways 2 and 250, south of the city of Rushville, the county seat of Sheridan County, at an elevation of 3,881 feet (1,183 m).  Lakeside has a post office, with ZIP code 69351.

History
Early settlers were John B. and Caroline Talbot Merrill, of Michigan and Norton, Suffolk, England respectively, circa 1890. Other early residents were the Nelson family, Danish immigrants. Daughters Lulu and Clara Nelson. P. McFadden 2018
The Lakeside post office was established in 1888. The community was named from the lake nearby.

References

Unincorporated communities in Sheridan County, Nebraska
Unincorporated communities in Nebraska